Sweet chestnut of Mount Tota is an old chestnut tree in Isparta Province, western Turkey.  It is a registered natural monument of the country.

The chestnut tree is located on Mount Tota at Kasımlar village in Sütçüler district of Isparta Province. It is a sweet chestnut (Castanea sativa). Its age is dated to be about 190 years old.

The tree was registered a natural monument on September 6, 2002.

References

Isparta Province
Natural monuments of Turkey
Protected areas established in 2002
2002 establishments in Turkey
Sütçüler District
Individual trees in Turkey